Jørgen Brønlund (14 December 1877 – November 1907), was a Greenlandic polar explorer, educator, and catechist. He participated in two Danish expeditions to Greenland in the early 20th century.

Early years
Brønlund, an Greenlandic Inuk and the son of a hunter, was born in Ilulissat, Greenland, Kingdom of Denmark, then known as Jakobshavn, on 14 December 1877.  He was a childhood friend of Knud Rasmussen whose father was a priest in Jakobshavn. Trained as a teacher, Brønlund graduated in 1901 from Nuuk College and was employed as a catechist at a trading post near the Nuup Kangerlua estuary.

Career
Along with Rasmussen, Harald Moltke, and Ludvig Mylius-Erichsen, Brønlund was a member of the 1902-1903 Danish Literary Greenland Expedition.   At its conclusion, Brønlund went to Denmark.  Here, he studied drawing with Kristian Zahrtmann and taught in Askov at Denmark's largest folk high school.

An expert interpreter, one of Brønlund's responsibilities during the 1906 Danish Expedition to Northeast Greenland under Mylius-Erichsen was to keep a travel diary, and to drive the dogs. He died in November 1907 of hunger and freezing while travelling back from the Independence Fjord and attempting to return to their base camp. He was found near the depot in Lambert Land on 13 March 1908 along with his diary that recounted the fate of Mylius-Erichsen and the expedition's cartographer, Niels Peter Høeg Hagen, both of whom died before Brønlund in Nioghalvfjerdsbrae at 79° latitude. He was buried where he was found, at Kap Bergendahl in southeast Lambert Land. The headland is also known today as Brønlunds Grave.

The last entry of his diary reads as follows:

Legacy
The 172-page diary is archived at the Royal Danish Library. A memorial stone erected in Copenhagen's harbor quotes the diary's last lines.

Jørgen Brønlund Fjord in Peary Land is named in his honor. The one hundred year anniversary of his birth was commemorated by the issue of a Greenlandic postal stamp.
Also by a medallion of G (Eugene L. Daub), Sculptor, Pennsylvania:

References

External links

 Memorial to Ludvig Mylius-Erichsen (1872-1907), Niels Peter Høeg Hagen (1877-1907) and Jørgen Brønlund (1877-1907)

1877 births
1907 deaths
Greenlandic polar explorers
Greenlandic explorers
People from Ilulissat
Ilulissat
Greenlandic Inuit people